Overman may refer to:

Entertainment
 Overman (film), a 2015 South Korean film
Overman King Gainer, a Japanese anime television series
Overman, an alternative version of Superman in DC Comics

Other uses
Overman (surname)
Friedrich Nietzsche's concept of the Übermensch, occasionally translated "Overman" (as opposed to, e.g., "Superman")
A supervisor, particularly in the coal mining industry
Overman Act, an American law that increased presidential power during World War I
The Overman Committee, a subcommittee of the United States Senate
Overman rearrangement, a chemical reaction
Overman Wheel Company, an American bicycle manufacturer